Patrick Kypson (born 28 October 1999) is an American tennis player.

Biography
Kypson has a career high ATP singles ranking of 449 achieved on 18 February 2019. He also has a career high ATP doubles ranking of 577 achieved on 27 May 2019.

Kypson made his Grand Slam main draw debut at the 2017 US Open after receiving a wild card for winning the under-18 boys championship.

2018
Kypson began the season at the USA F1 Futures in Los Angeles, where he won three qualifying matches before losing in the first round of the main draw. His next event was the USA F2 Futures in Long Beach. Failing to make the main draw here, he lost in the final round of qualifying.

ATP Challenger and ITF Futures finals

Singles: 4 (3–1)

Doubles: 2 (1–1)

References

External links

1999 births
Living people
American male tennis players
Sportspeople from Durham, North Carolina
Sportspeople from Raleigh, North Carolina
Tennis people from North Carolina
Texas A&M Aggies men's tennis players